Raja Ranichi Ga Jodi ( Like A Pair Of King and Queen) is a Marathi television drama which is airing on Colors Marathi. It started from 18 December 2019. The show is written by Chinmay Mandlekar.

Plot 
Sanjivani lives with her parents and her two elder sisters. The eldest of which is married and pregnant, but stays in the house along with her husband. Her father Panjabrao has lots of debt hanging over his head. He is a miser and cunning man who tries to exploit money from people, even from Sanjivani's in-laws. He took a loan from Aabasaheb Dhale-Patil for his middle daughter Swarangi's foreign education, but Aabasaheb makes an agreement with Panjabrao that after his daughter Swarangi returns from foreign, she has to marry his younger son Ranjit Dhale-Patil, who is an IPS Officer.

At the same time, Sanjivani is running her own secret business with her friend Moni called "Kalyani Papad Udyog" to help her family financially. Ranjit catches Sanjivani while breaking the traffic rules. She lies and tells him that her brother is in hospital. Actually, Ranjit is on the way to meet her elder sister Swarangi for discussion of marriage. Ranjit gets to know that Sanjivani and Swarangi are sisters and they do not have a brother. After some days, Sanjivani and Ranjit are compelled to marry under circumstances. Their marriage ends up in a pickle when it is found out that Sanjivani was not of legal age when she got married at 17, and that the year of her true birthdate of 18 September 2002 was fraudulently falsified to 2001 by her father for that reason.

Airing history

Cast

Main 
 Maniraj Pawar as Ranjit Aabasaheb Dhale-Patil
 Shivani Sonar as Sanjivani Panjabrao Bandal / Sanjivani Ranjit Dhale-Patil

Recurring 
 Shubhangi Gokhale as Kusumavati Aabasaheb Dhale-Patil (Aaisaheb)
 Kalyani Choudhari as Kalyani Panjabrao Bandal (Sanjivani's mother)
 Shrikant Yadav as Panjabrao Rajvardhan Bandal (Sanjivani's father)
 Rashmi Joshi as Swarangi Panjabrao Bandal (Sanjivani's second elder sister)
 Shweta Kharat as Monika Sujit Dhale-Patil (Moni, Sanjivani's friend and Sujit's second wife)
 Shruti Atre as Rajashri Dadasaheb Dhale-Patil (Vahinisaheb, Dadasaheb's wife)
 Gargi Phule-Thatte as Baby Maushi
 Apurva Kadam as Sajiri Panjabrao Bandal (Sanjivani's eldest sister)
 Ajay Purkar / Shailesh Korade as Dadasaheb Aabasaheb Dhale-Patil (Ranjit's elder brother)
 Parth Ghatge as Sujit Aabasaheb Dhale-Patil (Ranjit's younger brother)
 Ankita Nikrad as Aparna More / Aparna Sujit Dhale-Patil (Sujit's first wife)
 Vidya Sawale as Inspector Gulab

Adaptations

References

External links 
 
 Raja Ranichi Ga Jodi at Voot

Marathi-language television shows
2019 Indian television series debuts
Colors Marathi original programming